Moussa Guel (born 23 June 1999) is an Ivorian professional footballer who plays as a forward for Turkish club Samsunspor.

Career
Guel started playing at the age of five, but formally joined FC Lorient in 2009, at ten years of age. He made his professional debut for Lorient in a 2–1 Ligue 2 win over FC Sochaux-Montbéliard on 8 December 2017.

After playing for Red Star on loan in the 2021–22 season, on 6 July 2022 Guel rejoined the club on a permanent basis.

He signed for Samsunspor in January 2023.

Personal life
Guel's father, Tchiressoua Guel, was also a professional footballer and represented the Ivory Coast national team.

References

External links
 
 
 FC Lorient club profile

1999 births
Footballers from Abidjan
Living people
Ivorian footballers
Association football forwards
FC Lorient players
US Quevilly-Rouen Métropole players
Valenciennes FC players
Red Star F.C. players
Samsunspor footballers
Ligue 2 players
Championnat National players
Championnat National 2 players
TFF First League players
Ivorian expatriate footballers
Expatriate footballers in France
Ivorian expatriate sportspeople in France
Expatriate footballers in Turkey
Ivorian expatriate sportspeople in Turkey